

Confederate generals



Assigned to duty by E. Kirby Smith
Incomplete appointments
State militia generals

The Confederate and United States processes for appointment, nomination and confirmation of general officers were essentially the same. The military laws of the United States required that a person be nominated as a general officer by the president and be confirmed by the Senate and that his commission be signed and sealed by the president.

Despite legal interpretations that would preclude posthumous confirmation of appointments or delivery of commissions, the U.S. Senate and the Confederate Senate confirmed a few appointments of officers known to be dead and did not recall or revoke a few other confirmed appointments for officers who had recently died or died before receiving their commissions. No brevet appointments were made in the Confederate States Army but twenty acting or temporary general officers were authorized by and appointed under Confederate States law. At least one State militia (Virginia) had at least one brevet general (Francis Henney Smith).

Although not as prevalent as in the Union Army, some dates of rank in the Confederate States Army were before the date of appointment or commission. Under an Act of September 1, 1861, the Confederate Congress permitted Confederate President Jefferson Davis to make recess appointments and nominations subject to Confederate Senate confirmation during the next term. Confederate Senate confirmation of general officer appointments was usually prompt early in the war but often was delayed in the last two years of the war.

Details concerning Confederate officers who were appointed to duty as generals late in the war by General E. Kirby Smith in the Confederate Trans-Mississippi Department, who have been thought of as generals and exercised command as generals but who were not duly appointed and confirmed or commissioned, and state militia generals who had field commands in certain actions in their home states but were never given appointments or commissions in the Confederate States Army are in the List of American Civil War generals (Acting Confederate). Not all colonels or lower ranking officers who exercised brigade or division command at any time are in this list but those most often erroneously referred to as generals are. A few acting or temporary Confederate generals were duly appointed and confirmed as such. The full entries for these officers are in this list.

The notes mainly show pre-war military education or experience, pre-war political office, ranks and appointments prior to general officer appointments, some major assignments or events, information on wounds, killed in action or otherwise during the war, a few close relationships, deaths soon after the war, several of the longest lived generals and Spanish–American War service.

Abbreviations and notes:
Rank column: conf. = date appointment confirmed by Confederate Senate; nom. = date nominated by Confederate President Jefferson Davis; rank = date of rank
USMA = United States Military Academy at West Point, New York;
South Carolina Military Academy = Predecessor to The Citadel at Charleston, South Carolina;
VMI = Virginia Military Institute at Lexington, Virginia
Additional notes: ranks: lt. = lieutenant

A

B

C

D

E

F

G

H

I

J

K

L

M

N

O

P

Q

R

S

T

V

W

Y

Z 

The full text of the following three sections has been moved to List of American Civil War Generals (Acting Confederate). The names of the officers in each section are retained under each section here for convenience and reference.

Assigned to duty by E. Kirby Smith
Bagby, Arthur Pendleton Jr.
DeBray, Xavier
Gordon, Benjamin Franklin
Jackman, Sidney Drake
King, Wilburn Hill
Lewis, Levin Major
Maclay, Robert Plunket
Randal, Horace
Terrell, Alexander Watkins

Incomplete appointments, unconfirmed appointments, refused appointments, posthumous appointments or undelivered commissions
Ashby, Henry Marshall
Ashby, Turner
Barry, John D.
Bartow, Francis Stebbins
Benton, Samuel
Bowles, Pinckney Downie
Brevard, Jr. Theodore W.
Browne, William Montague, "Constitution"
Cobb, Thomas Reade Rootes
Dearing, James
Deshler, James
Dunovant, John
Fauntleroy, Thomas Turner
Fiser, John Calvin
Frazer, John W.
Garrott, Isham Warren
Girardey, Victor J. B.
Godwin, Archibald C.
Goggin, James M.
Hagan, James
Hannon, Moses Wright
Hatton, Robert Hopkins
Henderson, Robert Johnson
Hodge, George B.
Johnson, Adam Rankin "Stovepipe"
Jones, John R.
Martin, John D.
Moore, Samuel Preston
Munford, Thomas Taylor
Northrop, Lucius B.
O'Neal, Edward Asbury
Pegram, William "Willie"
Phifer, Charles W.
Porterfield, George
Rains, James Edwards
Robertson, Felix Huston
Semmes, Raphael, "Beeswax", "Bim" – rear admiral, Confederate States Navy; brigadier general, appointed April 5, 1865 (unconfirmed)
Taylor, Thomas H.
Thomas, Bryan Morel
Walker, Francis Marion

State militia generals 
The highest rank attained in the named state militia is shown. The rank in the Confederate Army, if known, is shown. 
Alcorn, James Lusk - brigadier general, Mississippi militia, the Army of Mississippi
Anderson, Charles David - brigadier general, Georgia Militia Brigade; received his state militia appointment after his resignation from the CSA in 1864, related to injuries. 
Boggs, James - brigadier general, Virginia militia; he continued his brigade command in the CSA after his forces were incorporated into the Confederate Army
Brogden, Curtis Hooks - major general, North Carolina State militia 
Carson, James Harvey - brigadier general, Virginia militia 
Carswell, Reuben Walker - brigadier general, Georgia militia 
Chapman, Augustus A. - brigadier general, Virginia militia
Chase, William Henry - major general, Florida militia 
Clark, Edward - brigadier general, Texas
Clark, John Bullock - brigadier general, Missouri State Guard 
Clark, Meriwether Lewis Sr. - brigadier general, Missouri State Guard; rose to rank of colonel in the Confederate States Army
Davis, Jefferson - major general, Mississippi State Militia, the Army of Mississippi; thereafter Elected President and Commander in Chief of the Confederate States
de Saussure, Wilmot Gibbes - brigadier general, South Carolina militia; subsequently elected adjutant general and inspector general of the S.C. militia
Ford, John Salmon "R.I.P." "Rip" - senior captain, Texas state troops; Captain Texas Rangers; served at rank of colonel in the Confederate Army
Garlington, Albert Creswell - major general, South Carolina militia, after serving as brigadier general of the US Army prior to 1860; 
Harman, William Henry - brigadier general, Virginia militia, assistant adjutant general, Confederate Army
Harper, Kenton - major general, Virginia Militia; brigadier general, Virginia Provisional Army, and colonel once the VPA was joined to the Confederate Army
Harris, Jeptha Vining - brigadier general of state troops in Mississippi, later returned to serve as colonel within Mississippi (CSA rank status uncertain)
Harrison, Sr., George Paul - brigadier general, George militia, served at rank of colonel in the Confederate Army
McBride, James Haggin - brigadier general, Missouri State Guard 
McCay, Henry Kent - Georgia militia - served at rank of colonel in the Confederate Army
Meem, Gilbert Simrall - brigadier general, Virginia militia
Philips, Pleasant J. - brigadier general, Georgia Militia
Rains, George W. - brigadier general, George militia, served at rank of colonel in the Confederate Army
Smith, Francis Henney - Major general, Virginia militia; served at rank of colonel in the Confederate Army
Thompson, Meriwether Jefferson, "Jeff", "Swamp Fox" - brigadier general, Missouri State Guard
Watkins, Nathaniel W. - brigadier general, Missouri State Guard

See also

General officers in the Confederate States Army
General officers in the United States
List of American Civil War generals
List of American Civil War generals (Acting Confederate)
List of American Civil War generals (Union)
List of American Civil War brevet generals (Union)
Bibliography of the American Civil War

Notes

References
 Allardice, Bruce S. More Generals in Gray. Baton Rouge: Louisiana State University Press, 1995.  (pbk.).
 Boatner, III, Mark M., The Civil War Dictionary. David McKay Company, Inc., New York, 1959. .
 Eicher, John H., and Eicher, David J., Civil War High Commands, Stanford University Press, 2001. .
 Faust, Patricia L., ed., Historical Times Illustrated Encyclopedia of the Civil War. Harper & Row, Publishers, Inc., New York, 1986. . Entries by Faust, various authors.
 Heidler, David S., and Jeanne T. Heidler, eds. Encyclopedia of the American Civil War: A Political, Social, and Military History. New York: W. W. Norton & Company, 2000. . Entries by Heidler and Heidler, various authors.
 Sifakis, Stewart, Who Was Who in the Civil War. Facts On File, New York, 1988. .
 United States War Department, The Military Secretary's Office, Memorandum relative to the general officers appointed by the President in the armies of the Confederate States--1861-1865 (1908) (Compiled from official records). Caption shows 1905 but printing date is February 11, 1908. Retrieved August 5, 2010.
 Warner, Ezra J., Generals in Gray. Louisiana State University Press, Baton Rouge, 1959. .

External links

American Civil War Generals, retrieved February 18, 2008
Confederate Generals from West Point, retrieved February 18, 2008
The Generals of the American Civil War, retrieved from Archive.org, April 9, 2009
US Civil War Generals, retrieved September 12, 2010

Civil War generals Confederate
 
American Civil War
Generals
American Confederate